Herman Johan "Hans" Achterhuis (born September 1, 1942, Hengelo) is Professor Emeritus in Systematic Philosophy at the University of Twente, The Netherlands and one of the country's foremost philosophers. For now his research concerns particularly social and political philosophy and philosophy of technology.

His list of publications shows a great scope (in fields of medical care, labour, third-world-philosophy). In 1967, he took his doctoral degree on Albert Camus.

His latest books handle the topics of utopianism (‘De erfenis van de utopie’, ‘The Legacy of Utopia’) and the tension between morality and politics in relation to the Kosovo War (“Politiek van Goede bedoelingen’, ‘Policy of good intentions’). He is co-author of the volume American Philosophy of Technology; The Empirical Turn. This work includes contributions on Albert Borgmann, Hubert Dreyfus, Andrew Feenberg, Donna Haraway, Don Ihde and Langdon Winner.

Main thoughts 

His ideas add up to a philosophy of things (objects) and a plea for a morality of machines. Rather than being morally neutral, things guide our behaviour (barriers in the subway forcing us to buy a ticket). This is why they are capable of exerting moral pressure that is much more effective than imposing sanctions or trying to reform the way people think. Utopia has been superseded but the world can still be improved, if we take seriously our moral ties to the machines and devices that surround us.

Philosopher Laureate 
In 2011 Achterhuis was chosen as the first Philosopher Laureate of the Netherlands. This honorary title was an initiative of the Magazine Filosofie, and the Philosophy Month Foundation (Stichting Maand van de Filosofie), together with the newspaper Trouw. The person is chosen by a group of journalists and academics. The aim of the initiative  is to allow a philosophy heavyweight to speak in the media, to place news events in a broader context. In 2013 Achterhuis was succeeded as Philosopher Laureate by René Gude (Soerabaja, 2 March 1957 – Amsterdam, 13 March 2015).

Publications 
Achterhuis, H.J. (1995) De utopie en haar verschijningsvorm, Amsterdam; Lumiance Lecture.
Achterhuis, H.J. (1995) The History and Roots of Growth, in: van Dieren, W. (Ed.) Taking Nature into Account: a report to the Club of Rome, New York; Copernicus, Springer-Verlag New York Inc.: 15-27. (translated into Dutch, German, French, Spanish, Italian, and Japanese)
Achterhuis, H.J. (1996) La responsabilita tra il timore e l'utopia, in: Hottois, G., Pinsart, M.G. (Eds.) Hans Jonas. Natura e responsabilita, Lecce, Italie; Edizioni Milella: 99-110.
Achterhuis, H.J. e.a. (1997), Van Stoommachine tot cyborg; denken over techniek in de nieuwe wereld, Baarn; Ambo: 7-16.
Achterhuis, H.J. (1998) De erfenis van de utopie, Baarn; Ambo: 444 pp.
Achterhuis, H.J. (ed.) (2001), American Philosophy of Technology: the Empirical Turn, Bloomington/Minneapolis: Indiana University Press
Achterhuis, H.J. (2008), Met alle geweld: Een filosofische zoektocht, Rotterdam; Lemniscaat
Achterhuis, H.J. (2010), De utopie van de vrije markt, Rotterdam; Lemniscaat

References

1942 births
Living people
Political philosophers
20th-century Dutch philosophers
21st-century Dutch philosophers
Social philosophers
Philosophers of technology
People from Hengelo
Utrecht University alumni
Academic staff of the University of Twente